"Marvellous & Mine" is a song recorded by British singer Lisa Stansfield for her 1993 album, So Natural. It was released as the fourth and Japanese only single on 21 July 1994. The song was written by Stansfield, Ian Devaney and Andy Morris, and produced by Devaney. The single was issued just before Stansfield's tour in Japan in September 1994.

The CD single included Sure Is Pure 12" Mix and Edited Master Mix of "Marvellous & Mine." It also featured previously released remixes of "So Natural" and "Little Bit of Heaven." The remix of "Marvellous & Mine" was also included on the "Dream Away" 1994 single and the 2014 deluxe 2CD + DVD re-release of So Natural (also on The Collection 1989–2003).

Critical reception
The song received positive reviews from music critics. Quentin Harrison from Albumism described the song as "luxurious" and " evocative strings, brass and bass rhythms". AllMusic editor William Cooper noted it as a "sunny, up-tempo number" in his review of So Natural. Pop Rescue called it "a grower", adding that the song "starts with a funky bassline".

Track listings
Japanese CD single ("Marvellous & Mine" Natural Selection)
"So Natural" (DJ Duro's Hip Hop Mix) – 5:27
"So Natural" (U.S. Remix) – 5:25
"Little Bit of Heaven" (Bad Yard Club 12" Mix) – 7:27
"Little Bit of Heaven" (Junior Vocal Mix) – 6:39
"Marvellous & Mine" (Edited Master Mix) – 4:14
"Marvellous & Mine" (Sure Is Pure 12" Mix) – 9:43

Other remixes
"Marvellous & Mine" (Sure Is Pure 12" Edit) – 8:28

References

Lisa Stansfield songs
1994 singles
Songs written by Lisa Stansfield
1993 songs
Arista Records singles
Songs written by Ian Devaney
Songs written by Andy Morris (musician)
Disco songs